Goalgram is a village in Gopalganj District, Bangladesh, part of Muksudpur Upazila. The village covers an area of 2.5 km2, and is bordered by the villages of Nanikhir, Barovatra, Mohistoli, Jalirpar.

Goalgram under Nanikhir Union parishad was established in 1856. The village consists of two wards and few mahallas. The village has three primary schools, twelve temples, one high school, one public clinic and few community schools.

Non-governmental organizations operating in Mohishtoli include Bangladesh Development Acceleration Organisation, BRAC, CCDB, ASA, World Vision, and HCCB, and Navoprojonmo Jubo Shongho.

Populated places in Dhaka Division